Seth Martin (May 4, 1933 – September 6, 2014) was a Canadian ice hockey player. He played professionally for the St. Louis Blues of the National Hockey League. He was inducted into the International Ice Hockey Federation Hall of Fame in 1997.

Seth Martin helped the Trail Smoke Eaters win the 1961 World Ice Hockey Championships as the last amateur team to win the World Championships from Canada. He was named the best goaltender of the tournament. He also played in four more World Championships with the Trail Smoke Eaters where he was named best goaltender in three of the four tournaments. In 1964, he played with team Canada at the Olympics where the team finished fourth.  Martin played for the St. Louis Blues in 1967–1968, appearing in 30 games as backup for Glenn Hall.  The Blues made it to the Stanley Cup Finals but lost in four straight to the Montreal Canadiens.

After the season Martin had to choose between continuing his NHL career and keeping his firefighters pension. He chose the latter and moved back to Trail, British Columbia but continued to play hockey and eventually coach. He died after a heart attack in 2014 in Trail, British Columbia, aged 81.

References

External links
Spokane Chronicle, November 6, 1982; accessed September 8, 2014. 

1933 births
2014 deaths
Canadian ice hockey goaltenders
Ice hockey people from British Columbia
IIHF Hall of Fame inductees
People from Rossland, British Columbia
Portland Buckaroos players
St. Louis Blues players
Spokane Spokes players
Vancouver Canucks (WHL) players
Western International Hockey League players
Olympic ice hockey players of Canada
Ice hockey players at the 1964 Winter Olympics